John Eston may refer to:

 John Aston (fl. 1362–1391) or John Eston, MP
John Eston (died 1565), MP 
John Eston (priest) (fl. 1400s–1420s), Canon of Windsor